The BJW Junior Heavyweight Championship is a title defended in the Japanese professional wrestling promotion Big Japan Pro Wrestling (BJW).

On May 7, 2017, BJW announced that it was bringing back the BJW Junior Heavyweight Championship with a tournament set to take place between May 25 and July 17. The title is distinct from the previous BJW Junior Heavyweight Championship that was established in 1998 and was retired in 2002. Wrestlers over the weight limit will be eligible to challenge for the BJW World Strong Heavyweight Championship.

There have been a total of seven reigns shared between seven different champions. The current champion is Kota Sekifuda who is in his first reign.

Inaugural tournament
The round-robin league began on May 25, 2017, and ran all the way through to the decision match, between the top two, on the July 17 show at Ryōgoku Kokugikan.

Title history

Combined reigns 

{| class="wikitable sortable" style="text-align: center"
!Rank
!Wrestler
!No. ofreigns
!Combineddefenses
!Combineddays
|-
!1
|style="background-color:#FFE6BD"| Kota Sekifuda † || 1 || 11 || +
|-
!2
| Yuya Aoki || 1 || 4 || 402
|-
!3
| Shinobu || 1 || 6 || 391
|-
!4
| Kazuki Hashimoto || 1 || 3 || 266
|-
!5
| Isami Kodaka || 1 || 4 || 204
|-
!6
| Tajiri || 1 || 3 || 133
|-
!7
| Tatsuhiko Yoshino|| 1 || 2 || 70
|-

See also
BJW Junior Heavyweight Championship (1998–2002)

References

Big Japan Pro Wrestling championships
Junior heavyweight wrestling championships

ja:BJW認定ジュニアヘビー級王座#第2期